Hans Christian Doseth (December 10, 1958 in Romsdal, Norway – August 6, 1984 in Pakistan) was a Norwegian climber.

Achievements
Among his achievements were several first ascents of routes on Trollveggen (Troll Wall), Romsdal's north facing big wall, both in winter and summer. He did the first all-free ascent of the wall in 1979 (the "Rimmon Route"), and the first winter ascent of the "Swedish Route" (1980). Most notable was his first ascent of the technically difficult "Trollkjerringruta" (the Troll's Wife)  in winter (1982), followed by the free ascent in summer 1983. Though moderately graded by today's standards (Norw. grade 7, French grade 6c+), it is a demanding, serious climb through partly loose and poorly protected rock that up to this day has seen only two or three repeats.  Doseth also increased awareness of sport climbing in Northern Europe, introducing routes in the 5.12 range (French 7b/c) in Norway and Sweden in the early 80s.

Death
Doseth died along with his climbing partner Finn Dæhli during an expedition with Stein P. Aasheim and Dag Kolsrud on Great Trango Tower (6286 m) in Karakoram, Pakistan, during descent, after establishing the Norwegian Buttress, the first route to scale the massive east face of the mountain. The causes of the accident are not known.

References

External links
 Article from High Sport Magazine (in Swedish)

Literature
 Bø, Bjarte and Anne Grete Nebell, Klatring i Romsdal, 1999.
 Stein P. Aasheim, Trango – triumf og tragedie, Scanbok, 1985

1958 births
1984 deaths
Mountaineering deaths
Norwegian mountain climbers
Sport deaths in Pakistan